William Ernest Jackson (called Ernest) was a Canadian Anglican priest in the first two thirds of the 20th century.

Jackson was educated at the University of Saskatchewan. Ordained in 1933,  his first post was at Kinistino. After a spell at St. Alban's Cathedral, Prince Albert he held incumbencies in Winnipeg, Calgary and Montreal. He was Dean of Niagara from 1950 to  1963. He became a Doctor of Divinity (DD).

References

University of Saskatchewan alumni
Deans of Niagara
20th-century Canadian Anglican priests